This is a list of Evangelical Lutheran Church in America colleges and universities:

 Augsburg University (Minneapolis, Minnesota) 
 Augustana College (Rock Island, Illinois)
 Augustana University (Sioux Falls, South Dakota)  
 Bethany College (Lindsborg, Kansas)  
 California Lutheran University (Thousand Oaks, California)
 Capital University (Bexley, Ohio)
 Carthage College (Kenosha, Wisconsin) 
 Concordia College (Moorhead, Minnesota) 
 Finlandia University (Hancock, Michigan) 
 Gettysburg College (Gettysburg, Pennsylvania)  
 Grand View University (Des Moines, Iowa) 
 Gustavus Adolphus College (St. Peter, Minnesota) 
 Lenoir–Rhyne University (Hickory, North Carolina)
 Luther College (Decorah, Iowa)  
 Midland University (Fremont, Nebraska) 
 Muhlenberg College (Allentown, Pennsylvania) 
 Newberry College (Newberry, South Carolina) 
 Pacific Lutheran University (Parkland, Washington) 
 Roanoke College (Salem, Virginia) 
 St. Olaf College (Northfield, Minnesota) 
 Susquehanna University (Selinsgrove, Pennsylvania)
 Texas Lutheran University (Seguin, Texas) 
 Thiel College (Greenville, Pennsylvania) 
 Wagner College (Staten Island, New York)
 Wartburg College (Waverly, Iowa) 
 Wittenberg University (Springfield, Ohio)

Former or defunct colleges
 Dana College (Blair, Nebraska), closed in 2010
 Upsala College (East Orange, New Jersey), closed in 1995 
 Waldorf College (Forest City, Iowa), sold to Columbia Southern University in 2010 and was renamed to Waldorf University in 2016

See also
List of Lutheran colleges and universities in the United States

Lutheran
Lutheran